CureSearch for Children's Cancer is a national non-profit that funds next-generation research that will lead to safe, effective treatments for children with cancer.

Overview
CureSearch for Children's Cancer is a national 501(c)(3) non-profit foundation with a mission to end childhood cancer by driving targeted and innovative research with measurable results in an accelerated time frame. CureSearch only funds projects with commercial potential, anticipated to reach patients in the clinic or marketplace within three to five years.

CureSearch’s three distinct research programs fund translational, pre-clinical and clinical research, and prioritize innovative therapies that have strong potential to lead to more effective and less-toxic therapies, including novel targeted therapeutics, immunotherapy and combination therapies.

In addition, CureSearch hosts events across the United States, including the Ultimate Hike and CureSearch Walks, to raise funds for next-generation childhood cancer research, and honor and remember those affected by cancer.

History
CureSearch for Children’s Cancer has been a driving force behind childhood cancer research for more than 30 years. For many of those years, CureSearch (originally known as the National Childhood Cancer Foundation) acted as the fiscal agent for National Cancer Institute grants to members of the Children’s Oncology Group.

In 2012, CureSearch for Children’s Cancer became a privately funded organization, giving them the opportunity to examine the field of childhood cancer research and treatment, and re-engineer their research portfolio to demand real patient impact from funding.

Research Strategy 
CureSearch is laser-focused on driving new treatments to patients in an accelerated time frame. Translational, preclinical and clinical-stage awards give preference to areas of high unmet need – the cancers with the lowest survival rates, fewest or most damaging treatment options, and populations that are underserved, including adolescents and young adults. 

 Young Investigator Awards – Young Investigator awards combat the loss of promising scientists from the field by providing significant financial support to investigators early in their research careers. These grants are limited to truly transformational science designed to deliver the next generation of cancer treatment to the clinic in three to five years.
 Acceleration Initiative Awards – Acceleration Initiative projects are highly innovative, address a significant challenge in pediatric cancer drug development, and have a strong probability of clinical application — ready to reach patients within three years.
 Catapult Awards – Catapult Awards propel high-potential research out of the lab into the clinic and ultimately, to the kids who need it most. Catapult Awards provide funding for Phase 1 or Phase 2 clinical trials that advance promising therapies for pediatric cancer. The Catapult Award uniquely funds cutting-edge clinical trials that begin enrolling patients in less than a year, and every applicant must be partnered with a for-profit company to ensure they have developed the necessary infrastructure to ultimately move the therapy from clinical trials into the marketplace.

Patient and Family Resources 
CureSearch provides families with the resources and support they need to navigate a cancer diagnosis.

 Brave Barbie® – Through a partnership with Mattel, CureSearch provides children affected by cancer with a special, brave Barbie. These bald dolls are a great way to help children better understand hair loss associated with treatment.

 Educational Resources – The CureSearch website provides free resources, including a clinical trial finder and educational videos that are accessed by more than one million people each year. 
 CancerCare Mobile App – The free CancerCare mobile app allows parents and caregivers to track treatment dates, medication schedules, side effects, blood counts and more.

Charity statistics 
The organization's allocation of funds for the fiscal year ending February 28, 2010 lists 84% of funds for program expenses. The remaining 16% are allocated between three other fields: donated services 12%, fund raising expenses 2% and administrative expenses 2%.

Charity Navigator rates the foundation four of four stars.

References

External links

Charities based in the United States